Jane Douglas may refer to:

Lady Jane Douglas (1698–1753), Scottish noblewoman
Jane Scott, Countess of Dalkeith (1701–1729), born Lady Jane Douglas, Scottish noblewoman
Jane Douglas (Mother Douglas) (c. 1700–1761), English brothel-keeper
Jane Douglas, British YouTuber, co-editor of the OutsideXbox channel